Dritte Wahl is a German punk rock band from Rostock in Germany.

Dritte Wahl (translated: "Third Choice") first performed in 1988. They play political punk rock and were doing it back in East Germany. The band was founded by Holm, Busch´n, Gunnar and Krel. However, bass player Holm left Dritte Wahl in 1991 and the remaining line-up consisted of Busch´n (vocals, bass, † 2005), Gunnar (guitar, vocals) and Krel (drums) back then. Their lyrics often contain personal or sociocritical lyrics with left-wing impact. 

In 1998 the band founded their own record label under the name Rausch Records, that was later renamed as Dritte Wahl Records.

On 17 January 2005, Busch´n died of stomach cancer aged 35. The remaining members didn't want to disband, but to continue their career (as it was also Busch´n's explicit wish).

Since 19 April 2005, Stefan - formerly guitarist for the Crushing Caspars - has been playing the bass.

Dritte Wahl are known for their energetic live concerts. Extended tours headed them through the whole of Germany and most European countries (including The Netherlands, Belgium, Austria, Italy, Spain, Switzerland, the Czech Rep., Serbia, Croatia, Slovakia and Hungary). In 2010 Dritte Wahl played some concerts in Cuba.

Gallery

Discography
 1992: Fasching in Bonn (Mardi gras at Bonn), CD/LP
 1994: Auge um Auge (An eye for an eye), CD/LP
 1995: 6 Track Split mit den Dödelhaien, CD/10“ Vinyl
 1996: Nimm drei (Take three), CD/LP
 1998: Strahlen (Rays), CD/LP
 1998: Hallo Erde (Hello Earth), 7“ Vinyl
 1999: Delikat (Delicious), CD/LP
 2000: Heimspiel (Home match), EP (unter dem Namen Kollektiv Hein Butt)
 2001: Und jetzt? (And now?), MCD/10"
 2001: Halt mich fest (Hold me tight), CD/LP
 2002: Roggen Roll (Rye Roll, a pun on Rock 'n' Roll), CD/LP
 2003: Meer Roggen Roll (Sea Rye Roll, a pun on Mehr Rock 'n' Roll [More Rock 'n' Roll]), CD
 2003: Die sonderbare Tape-CD (The amazing Tape-CD), CD
 2004: Tooth for tooth, CD/LP
 2005: Fortschritt (Progress), CD/LP
 2006: Drei Live DVD
 2010: Gib Acht, CD/LP (Take Heed)
 2012: Fasching in Bonn - Remastered, CD/LP
 2012: Auge um Auge - Remastered, CD/LP
 2012: Nimm drei - Remastered, CD/LP
 2015: Geblitzdingst (Flashy-Thingy), CD/LP
 2017: 10, CD/LP
 2020: 3D, CD/LP

External links

  

East German musical groups
Deutschpunk
Deaths from stomach cancer